Muhammad Zafuan bin Azeman (born 10 June 1999) is a Malaysian professional footballer who plays as a forward for Thai League 2 club Uthai Thani.

Club career

Kedah 
In November 2017, Zafuan signed a one-year contract for Kedah in the Malaysia Super League. Under the management of Ramón Marcote Pequeño, he made 2 appearances with the club and didn't scored any goal for Kedah.

Perlis FA 
In January 2019, Zafuan signed for  Malaysia Premier League side Perlis . He joined the team from Kedah on a free transfer. In the 2019 season, he made 20 appearances for the club and score 4 goals for Perlis

Angthong 
In September 2019, Zafuan signed a two-year contract with Angthong in the Thai League 3; following financial issues, his contract was terminated on 11 May 2020.

Penang 
Zafuan returned to Malaysia on 10 January 2021, joining Penang ahead of the 2021 Malaysia Super League. On 20 March 2021, Zafuan made his debut with Malaysia Super League side Penang F.C. in a 0-2 win over Selangor F.C. in the Malaysia Super League. Zafuan made his team debut after got subs in 92th minute replacing Casagrande (footballer).

Under the management of Tomáš Trucha, he made 3 appearances with Penang F.C. before joining Kelantan United on the 2nd transfer window.

Kelantan United 
On 25 May 2021, Zafuan joined fellow Malaysia Premier League club Kelantan United on loan from Penang F.C.. 
He made 6 appearances with the club and score 1 goal for Kelantan United. He collected a total of 305 minutes played for the club.

Uthai Thani 
In January 2023, Zafuan joined Uthai Thani in the Thai League 2.

On 15th January 2023, Zafuan made his Thai League 2 debut by coming off the bench in  Uthai Thani 1-1 draw against Chiangmai United F.C.. He got subbed in 79th minutes replacing Kittisak Phutchan.

International career

Malaysia U-18
In 2017, Zafuan Azeman got his first international called up for Malaysia U-18. With the Malaysia U-18 squad, he made 3 appearances and scored 1 goal with the national team.

Malaysia U-19
In 2018, Zafuan was called up for Malaysia U-19 squad for 2018 AFF U-19 Youth Championship on July 2018 and 2018 AFC U-19 Championship on October 2018. He made 6 appearances with the team and scored 1 goal for Malaysia U-19.

Career statistics

Club 

.

Notes

Honours
Malaysia U19
 AFF U-19 Youth Championship: 2018

References

External links
 

1999 births
Living people
People from Perlis
Malaysian footballers
Association football forwards
Kedah Darul Aman F.C. players
Perlis FA players
Zafuan Azeman
Penang F.C. players
Kelantan United F.C. players
Malaysia Super League players
Zafuan Azeman
Zafuan Azeman
Malaysia youth international footballers
Malaysian expatriate footballers
Malaysian expatriate sportspeople in Thailand
Expatriate footballers in Thailand